Arun Dagar (born 17 April 1992) is a Tanzanian cricketer. He was named in Tanzania's squad for the 2016 ICC World Cricket League Division Five tournament in Jersey, playing in six matches.

References

External links
 

1992 births
Living people
Tanzanian cricketers
Place of birth missing (living people)